Deuterocopus tengstroemi is a moth of the family Pterophoridae. It is known from Java and Queensland, Australia.

Larvae have been recorded feeding on Vitis quadrangularis.

Original description

External links
Australian Faunal Directory
Trin Wiki

Moths of Australia
Moths of Indonesia
Deuterocopinae
Moths described in 1852